The House of Obsessive Compulsives is a 2005 television documentary broadcast by Channel 4 in the United Kingdom. The programme comprised two 60 minute episodes, broadcast on 1 August 2005  and 8th August 2005.

The programme follows three people with long-term and life disrupting obsessive-compulsive disorder who agree to move into a house together to undertake psychotherapeutic treatment. The intensive therapy is delivered by a team of psychotherapists from the London's Maudsley Hospital  over a period of nine days in an attempt to cure their problems.

The House of Obsessive Compulsives was produced by Monkey Kingdom.

References

External links
The House of Obsessive Compulsives at Channel4.com

 

Channel 4 original programming
2005 television specials
Works about obsessive–compulsive disorder
British television documentaries